In geometry, the Gram–Euler theorem, Gram-Sommerville, Brianchon-Gram or Gram relation (named after Jørgen Pedersen Gram, Leonhard Euler, Duncan Sommerville and Charles Julien Brianchon) is a generalization of the internal angle sum formula of polygons to higher-dimensional polytopes. The equation constrains the sums of the interior angles of a polytope in a manner analogous to the Euler relation on the number of d-dimensional faces.

Statement 
Let  be an -dimensional convex polytope. Then the Gram–Euler theorem states: In non-Euclidean geometry of constant curvature (i.e. spherical, and hyperbolic, geometry) the relation gains a volume term, but only if the dimension n is even:Here,  is the normalized (hyper)volume of the polytope (i.e, the fraction of the n-dimensional spherical or hyperbolic space); the angles  also have to be expressed as fractions (of the (n-1)-sphere).

When the polytope is simplicial additional angle restrictions known as Perles relations hold, analogous to the Dehn-Sommerville equations for the number of faces.

Examples 

For a two-dimensional polygon, the statement expands into:where the first term  is the sum of the internal vertex angles, the second sum is over the edges, each of which has internal angle , and the final term corresponds to the entire polygon, which has a full internal angle . For a polygon with  faces, the theorem tells us that , or equivalently, . For a polygon on a sphere, the relation gives the spherical surface area or solid angle as the spherical excess: .

For a three-dimensional polyhedron the theorem reads:where  is the solid angle at a vertex,  the dihedral angle at an edge (the solid angle of the corresponding lune is twice as big), the third sum counts the faces (each with an interior hemisphere angle of ) and the last term is the interior solid angle (full sphere or ).

History 
The n-dimensional relation was first proven by Sommerville, Heckman and Grünbaum for the spherical, hyperbolic and Euclidean case, respectively.

See also 

 Euler characteristic
Dehn-Sommerville equations
 Angular defect
Gauss-Bonnet theorem

References 

Polytopes
Real algebraic geometry
Geometry